Modiesha station is a station on Line 8 and Line 18 of the Guangzhou Metro. Line 8 started operation on 28June 2003 and Line 18 started operation on 28September 2021. It is located under Xingang East Road in the Haizhu District of Guangzhou.

Before the extension to both lines 2 and 8 opened in September 2010, this station ran as part of Line 2 as a single line from Wanshengwei to Sanyuanli.

Station layout

References

Railway stations in China opened in 2003
Guangzhou Metro stations in Haizhu District